Moreto is a red Portuguese wine grape variety that is planted primarily in the Alentejo. As a varietal, the grape makes neutral wines.

Synonyms
Moreto is also known under the synonyms Arruya, Castellao, Moreto d'Alenteijo, Moreto d'Alentejo, Moreto do Dão, Morito, Mureto do Alentejo, Tinta de Alter.

Other grape varieties
Moreto is also used as a synonym for the grape varieties Lambrusca di Alessandria, Camarate Tinto, Baga and Mureto.

See also
List of Portuguese wine grape varieties

References

Red wine grape varieties